Gymnopilus sordidostipes is a species of mushroom-forming fungus in the family Hymenogastraceae.

Description

Distribution and habitat
Gymnopilus sordidostipes has been found growing in clusters on sawdust, in Oregon during November.

See also

List of Gymnopilus species

References

sordidostipes
Fungi of North America
Fungi described in 1969
Taxa named by Lexemuel Ray Hesler